The 2001 season was São Paulo's 72nd season since club's existence. São Paulo won the Torneio Rio-São Paulo for the first time beating Botafogo in an aggregated score by 6-2 (4-1 Away; 2-1 Home). In Campeonato Paulista the club finished in 8th place. Tricolor reach the Quarter-finals at the Campeonato Brasileiro and Copa do Brasil losing to Atlético Paranaense in the league and to Grêmio at the cup. São Paulo was eliminated at the group stage in the Copa Mercosur and became a runners-up at the Copa dos Campeões after was defeated by Flamengo.

Squad

Final squad

Scorers

Overall

Official competitions

Torneio Rio-São Paulo

Record

Campeonato Paulista

Record

Copa do Brasil

Record

Copa do Campeões

Record

Copa Mercosur

Record

Campeonato Brasileiro

Record

External links
official website 

Brazilian football clubs 2001 season
2001